Antonio Raimondi (September 19, 1826 – October 26, 1890) was a prominent Italian-born Peruvian geographer and scientist.  Born in Milan, Raimondi emigrated to Peru, arriving on July 28, 1850, at the port of Callao.  In 1851 he became a professor of natural history.  In 1856, he was one of the founding professors of the medical school at the National University of San Marcos; in 1861, he founded the analytical chemistry department.

Raimondi died in the town of San Pedro de Lloc in the La Libertad Region of northern Perú. The house in which he died still stands and is located within a block of the town's main plaza. It has been converted to a museum in his honor.

Throughout his career, Raimondi displayed a passion for all things Peruvian.  He undertook no less than 18 extensive journeys to all regions of the country, studying the nation's geography, geology, botany, zoology, ethnography, and archaeology.  In 1875, he collected his findings in the massive tome El Perú, which was subsequently republished in numerous editions over the next 40 years.  The Raimondi Museum in Lima houses some of the collections he gathered in his travels.

A popular historical figure in Peru, Raimondi is the namesake of many Peruvian cultural institutions, including schools, theaters, museums, and institutes of higher learning.  The Antonio Raymondi Province in the Ancash Region of Peru is also named after him.  Some of his biological discoveries also carry his name, such as the Neoraimondia genus of cactus.

Bibliography

Works 

 1854: Informes sobre la existencia de guano en las islas de Chincha presentados por la Comisión nombrada por el gobierno peruano, con los planos levantados por la misma Comisión, Tipografía "El Heraldo", Lima
 1857: Elementos de botánica aplicada a la medicina y a la industria en los cuales se trata especialmente de las plantas del Perú, Imp. Mariano Murga, Lima
 1862: Apuntes sobre la provincia litoral de Loreto, Tipografía Nacional (Imp. Manuel D. Cortés), Lima
 1864: Análisis de las aguas termales de Yura, aguas minerales de Jesús y aguas potables de Arequipa, Imp. Francisco Ibáñez, Arequipa
 1873: El departamento de Ancachs y sus riquezas minerales, Enrique Meiggs (Imp. "El Nacional" por Pedro Lira), Lima
 1873: La manipulación del guano, Imprenta del Estado, Lima
 1873: Manipulación del guano, Imp. "El Nacional", Lima
 1874: Guano y salitre. Observaciones a la memoria del sr. d. Daniel Desmaison, La Opinión Nacional, Lima
 1874: El Perú. Parte Preliminar (Tomo I), Imprenta del Estado, Lima
 1875: Observaciones al dictámen de los señores Cisneros y García en la cuestión relativa al salitre, Imp. de "La Opinión Nacional", Lima
 1876: El Perú. Historia de la Geografía del Perú (Tomo II), Imprenta del Estado, Lima
 1878: Minerales del Perú o catálogo razonado de una colección que representa los principales tipos minerales de la República, con muestras de huano y restos de aves que lo han producido, Imprenta del Estado, Lima
 1880: El Perú. Historia de la Geografía del Perú (Tomo III), Imprenta del Estado, Lima
 1880: Apéndice al catálogo razonado de los minerales del Perú, Imp. Prince y Bux, Lima
 1882: Aguas minerales del Perú, J. Galland y E. Henriod (Imp. C. Prince), Lima
 1883: Minas de oro de Carabaya, Carlos Paz Soldán, Lima
 1884: Aguas potables del Perú, F. Masías y Cía, Lima
 1885: Memoria sobre el Cerro de Pasco y la montaña de Chanchamayo, Imp. de La Merced (Peter Bacigalupi y Cía), Lima
 1887: Minas de oro del Perú, Impr. y Libr. B. Gil, Lima

Maps 
 1888: Mapa del Perú, Grabado e Imp. Erhard Frères, Paris

Posthumous publications 
 1902: Estudios geológicos del camino entre Lima y Morococha y alrededores de esta hacienda, Impr. y Libr. de San Pedro, Lima
 1929: El Perú. Itinerarios de viajes, Banco Italiano de Lima (Imp. Torres Aguirre), Lima
 1942: Notas de Viaje para su obra "El Perú" (Primer Volumen), Ing. Alberto Jochamowitz (Imp. Torres Aguirre), Lima
 1943: Notas de Viaje para su obra "El Perú" (Segundo Volumen), Ing. Alberto Jochamowitz (Imp. Torres Aguirre), Lima
 1955: 50 láminas inéditas de iconografía vegetal, Asociación Educacional Italiana, Lima
 1990: Epistolario de Antonio Raimondi, Asociación Educacional Antonio Raimondi, Lima
 1991: Apreciaciones personales. Cartas a Miguel Colunga (1859-1868), Biblioteca Nacional del Perú, Lima

Translations 
 1878: Minéraux au Pérou. Catalogue raisonné d'une collection des principaux types minéraux de la République comprenant aussi des échantillons de guano et des derbis fossilisés des oiseaux qui l'ont produit, A. Chaix et Cie (Imp. Centrale des Chemins de Fer), Paris

Works related to Antonio Raimondi 
 1966: Viajes por el Perú (por Jorge Guillermo Llosa ), Editorial Universitaria, Lima
 2005: Antonio Raimondi, mirada íntima del Perú. Epistolario, 1849-1890, Fondo Editorial del Congreso del Perú & Banco Central de Reserva del Perú, Lima

See also
 Raimondi Stela
 Puya raimondii
 El Perú

External links

Raimondi Museum – with a biography of Raimondi, maps of his travels, and catalog of the collection. 
Biographical information 

1826 births
1890 deaths
Peruvian botanists
Italian emigrants to Peru
Scientists from Milan
Academic staff of the National University of San Marcos
Italian geographers